God Save Poland may refer to:
English translation of the title Boże, coś Polskę, Polish Catholic patriotic hymn
"Boże Zbaw Polskę" ("God Save Poland" in Polish) 
motto on the flag of the Paberžė Regiment
inscription on the rant of the  coin issued during the October Uprising